SC Bettembourg is a Luxembourgish women's football club based in Bettembourg, Luxembourg. The club was founded in 1908 however the women's section has been in existence since 2012. SC Bettembourg play in Dames Ligue 1, the top flight of domestic women's football in Luxembourg. A second ladies team was introduced in 2014 and they currently play in the second tier. The team's colours are blue and white.

SC Bettembourg plays its home matches at Terrain 1 Bettembourg, a 1,000-capacity stadium that is situated in Bettembourg.

History 
SC Bettembourg has been running a men's team since 1908, but it wasn't until 2012 when the women's team was introduced. They began in Division 3 and quickly rose up the rankings. In their inaugural season, the women's team won promotion into the second division, then in the 2013–14 season SC Bettembourg won promotion into Division 1 as well as launching a second women's team.

In their first season in the top flight in the 2014–15 season, SC Bettembourg finished in second place only by goal difference – tied on points with Jeunesse Junglinster. SC Bettembourg's 15 year old attacker Karen Marin won player of the season. The team also finished second in the 2015–16 season, as well as finishing runners-up in the Women's Cup. After successive second places, in the 2016–17 season finally bettered their adversaries Jeunesse Junglinster by winning their first league title by a comfortable 6 points and thus qualifying for their first ever Women's Champions League.

SC Bettembourg did not fare well in the 2017–18 Women's Champions League qualifying round, losing their first match 0–8 to PAOK and not scoring a goal in two further defeats.

The team won their second league title out of just five top-flight seasons in the 2018–19 season and once again qualified for the Women's Champions League. Despite another thrashing in their first game of the 2019–20 edition, losing 0–12 to FC Minsk, SC Bettembourg scored their first Champions League goals in a 2–7 defeat to Split, with Kate Thill scoring both.

Current squad

Honours
 Dames Ligue 1
Winners: 2016–17, 2018–19
Runners-up: 2014–15, 2015–16, 2017–18
 Luxembourg Women's Cup
Runners-up: 2015–16

Record in UEFA Women's Champions League

Summary

By season

References

External links

Women's football clubs in Luxembourg